Samo najbolje (trans. Only the Best) is a compilation album by Serbian and former Yugoslav hard rock band Griva, released in 2002, following Griva's 2002 reunion.

Track listing
"Gde sam to pogrešio" - 3:20
"Svega če biti, al' nas nikad više" - 4:37
"Vojvodino, Vojvodino, što si tako ravna" - 3:40
"Istanbul" - 2:47
"Februar je mesec u znaku mačora" - 3:52
"Devojka biserne kose" - 5:04
"I noćas ću ti doći" - 4:00
"Što te tata pušta samu" - 2:43
"Nekad sam mogao 3X na dan" - 3:35
"Il' me ljubi il' me ubi" - 3:28
"Ja još imam snage" - 3:28
"Ti u Sarajevu ja u Novom Sadu" - 2:59
"Nađi sebi drugu ludu" - 3:00
"Nije mi ništa samo malo strepim" - 3:17
"Kad dođe jutro" - 4:02
"Saznala bi kad bi htela" - 4:38
"Srećan ti rođendan" - 3:01
"Saznala bi kad bi htela" - 2:29

References

 EX YU ROCK enciklopedija 1960-2006,  Janjatović Petar;  

Griva albums
2002 compilation albums
One Records (Serbia) compilation albums